Adrian Township is a township in Watonwan County, Minnesota. The population was 173 at the time of the 2000 census.

History
Adrian Township was organized in 1871.

Geography

Demographics
As of the census of 2000, there were 173 people, 80 households, and 56 families residing in the township. The population density was 5.0 people per square mile (1.9/km). There were 92 housing units at an average density of 2.7/sq mi (1.0/km). The racial makeup of the township was 95.38% White, 0.58% African American, 3.47% from other races, and 0.58% from two or more races. Hispanic or Latino of any race were 5.20% of the population.

There were 80 households, out of which 20.0% had children under the age of 18 living with them, 66.3% were married couples living together, 2.5% had a female householder with no husband present, and 30.0% were non-families. 27.5% of all households were made up of individuals, and 12.5% had someone living alone who was 65 years of age or older. The average household size was 2.16 and the average family size was 2.59.

In the township the population was spread out, with 16.2% under the age of 18, 4.6% from 18 to 24, 13.3% from 25 to 44, 41.6% from 45 to 64, and 24.3% who were 65 years of age or older. The median age was 50 years. For every 100 females, there were 108.4 males. For every 100 females age 18 and over, there were 110.1 males.

The median income for a household in the township was $41,875, and the median income for a family was $45,750. Males had a median income of $29,688 versus $17,292 for females. The per capita income for the township was $22,279. About 3.1% of families and 5.2% of the population were below the poverty line, including none of those under the age of eighteen and 7.7% of those sixty five or over.

References

Townships in Watonwan County, Minnesota
Townships in Minnesota